Equatorial Guinea is a unitary republic located on the west coast of Africa which is divided into eight provinces, 19 districts and 32 municipalities. These are organized as shown in the following table. Municipalities that are the capitals of their respective provinces are shown in bold.

List of Municipalities

See also

References

Subdivisions of Equatorial Guinea
Equatorial Guinea geography-related lists